The Geelong Falcons is a youth Australian rules football representative club in the NAB League, the Victorian statewide under-18s competition, Victoria, Australia.

The club takes in talented junior players from the Geelong, Colac and Warrnambool regions in order to prepare them for AFL selection. There is an under-15 V-Line cup side and an under-16 side, but the club's main focus is its under-18 side, who play a longer season.

In 2007, Jimmy Bartel became the first ex-Falcon to win the AFL Brownlow Medal, for the league's best and fairest player, while Jonathan Brown became the first ex-Falcon to win the Coleman Medal for the most goals in the season.

Gary Ablett Jnr also became the first ex-Falcon to win the Leigh Matthews Trophy, for being voted the Most Valuable Player by the AFL Players Association.

Hawthorn half-back Luke Hodge became the first Falcon to win the Norm Smith Medal for his best on ground performance in the 2008 Grand Final against the Geelong Cats.

Nick Maxwell became the first Geelong Falcons player to captain a premiership team when he led Collingwood to the 2010 AFL Premiership.

Honours
Premierships (3): 1992, 2000, 2017
Runners-up (2): 1994, 1998
Wooden Spoon (1): 2019

Notable Falcons players 

 Jonathan Brown - Brisbane Lions: Coleman Medallist 2007; All-Australian 2007, 2009; Premiership Player 2001, 2002, 2003; Brisbane co-captain 2007-2008; Brisbane sole captain 2009–2014
 Gary Ablett, Jr. - /: All-Australian 2007, 2008, 2009, 2010, 2011, 2012, 2013, 2014; All-Australian captain 2011; AFLPA MVP 2007, 2008, 2009; Premiership Player 2007, 2009; Brownlow Medallist 2009, 2013; Gold Coast captain 2011–2016
 Jimmy Bartel - : Brownlow Medallist 2007; All-Australian 2007, 2008; North Smith Medalist 2011; Premiership Player 2007, 2009, 2011
 Luke Hodge - : Number One Draft Pick 2001; All-Australian 2005, 2008, 2010, All-Australian Captain 2010; Norm Smith Medallist 2008, 2014; Premiership Player 2008, 2013, 2014, 2015 Hawthorn captain 2011–2016
 Chris Heffernan - /: Premiership Player 2000
 Matthew Primus - /: All-Australian 2001, 2002; Port Adelaide Captain 2001-05, Port Adelaide Coach 2010–2012
 Cameron Ling - : All-Australian 2007; Premiership Player 2007, 2009, 2011, Premiership Captain 2011; Geelong Captain 2010-2011
 Matthew Scarlett - : All-Australian 2003, 2004, 2007, 2008, 2009, 2011; Premiership Player 2007, 2009, 2011
 Scott Lucas - : Premiership Player 2000
 Jordan Lewis - /Melbourne: Premiership Player 2008, 2013, 2014, 2015
 Nick Maxwell - : Collingwood Captain 2008, Premiership Player/Captain 2010
 Amon Buchanan - /: Premiership Player 2005
 Matthew Capuano - /: Premiership Player 1996 and 1999
 Mark Blake - : Premiership Player 2009
 Allen Christensen - : Premiership Player 2011
 Will Schofield - West Coast Eagles: Premiership Player 2018
 Patrick Dangerfield: Brownlow medal 2016, all Australian 6x and premiership player 2022

Draftees
Many notable players in the Australian Football League have been recruited from the Geelong Falcons. These players include: 
1993: Glenn Gorman
1994: Scott Lucas, Tony Brown, Chris Hemley, Jeremy Dyer, Shaun Baxter, Peter Bird, Nathan Saunders, Scott Taylor
1995: Simon Fletcher, Joe McLaren, Nigel Credlin, Ryan Grinter
1996: Chris Heffernan, Bowen Lockwood, Brent Grgic, Jacob Rhodes
1997: James Rahilly, Matthew Scarlett, Lincoln Reynolds
1998: David A. Clarke, Steven Baker, Jay Solomon, David Loats, Marc Dragicevic, Tim van der Klooster
1999: David Haynes, Jonathan Brown, Tim Clarke, Cameron Ling, Bill Nicholls
2000: Sam Hunt, Sam Chapman, Andrew Siegert
2001: Luke Hodge, Jimmy Bartel, Luke Milan, Matt Maguire, Tom Davidson, Joel Reynolds, Gary Ablett Jr.
2002: Tim Callan, Lochlan Veale, Brent Moloney
2003: Mark Blake, Nathan Foley, Luke Buckland, James Allan
2004: Jordan Lewis, John Meesen, Tim Sheringham
2005: Shaun Higgins, Danny Stanley, Clint Bartram
2006: Travis Boak, Daniel O'Keefe, Will Schofield, Simon Hogan, Ryan Williams, Peter Hardy
2007: Lachlan Henderson, Patrick Dangerfield, Jack Steven, Adam Donohue, Jaxson Barham, Guy O'Keefe, Ed Curnow, Chris Kangars
2008: Ayce Cordy, Luke Rounds, Ben Bucovaz, Jordie McKenzie, Luke Delaney, Tom Simpkin
2009: Ben Cunnington, Gary Rohan, Jasper Pittard, Callum Bartlett, Allen Christensen, Luke Thompson, Joe Dare
2010: Billie Smedts, Jayden Pitt, Jeremy Taylor, Troy Davis, Cameron Delaney, Luke Dahlhaus, Josh Walker, Cameron Johnston
2011: Taylor Adams, Devon Smith, Jackson Merrett, Jay Lever, Jed Bews, Jai Sheehan, Andrew Boseley
2012: Mason Wood, Josh Saunders
2013: Darcy Lang, Darcy Gardiner, Lewis Taylor, Samuel Russell, Nick Bourke
2014: Paddy McCartin, Hugh Goddard, Teia Miles, Jackson Nelson, Zaine Cordy, Lewis Melican
2015: Darcy Parish, Charlie Curnow, Tom Doedee, Rhys Mathieson
2016: Alex Witherden, Sean Darcy, Jack Henry, Sam Simpson
2017: Matthew Ling, Tom McCartin, James Worpel, Gryan Miers, Josh Jaska
2018: Sam Walsh, Ned McHenry, Connor Idun, Brayden Ham, Oscar Brownless, Blake Schlensog
2019: Cooper Stephens
2020: Tanner Bruhn, Oliver Henry, Charlie Lazzaro, Cameron Fleeton
2021: Toby Conway, Mitchell Knevitt, Cooper Whyte

External links

1992 establishments in Australia
Australian rules football clubs established in 1992
Australian rules football clubs in Geelong
NAB League clubs
NAB League Girls clubs